Step Aside for a Lady is the fourth solo album by American soul singer Cissy Houston, released in 1980 on Columbia Records. It features the R&B hit songs, "Break It to Me Gently" and "You're the Fire".

The entire album features backing vocals by herself and her friends, Luther Vandross, Jocelyn Brown, and Eltesa Weathersby, and it was produced by Michael Zager with executive producer Jerry Love. "Break It to Me Gently" would be recorded a year later by jazz fusion singer Angela Bofill on her third album, Something About You.

Track listing

LP, Vinyl notes

Personnel

    Arranged By [Vocals] – Cissy Houston
    Backing Vocals – Cissy Houston, Eltesa Weathersby, Jocelyn Brown, Luther Vandross
    Bass – Francisco Centeno (tracks: A1, A2, B1, B2), Will Lee (tracks: A3, A4, B4)
    Drums – Allan Schwartzberg
    Engineer – Craig Winterson, Darroll Gustamachio, Jason Corsaro, Lincoln Clapp, Lou Brosnan, Lou Schlossberg, Michael Barbiero, Rick Rowe, Tim Geelan
    Executive-Producer – Jerry Love
    Guitar – Jeff Mironov (tracks: A1, A2, B1, B2), Steve Love (tracks: A3, A4, B4)
    Keyboards – Rob Mounsey
    Management – Billy Fields
    Mastered By – Bob Carbone, Stuart Alan Love
    Mixed By – Michael Barbiero
    Percussion – Rubens Bassini
    Producer, Arranged By, Conductor – Michael Zager
    Reeds – Jerry Niewood
    Saxophone – Ronnie Cuber
    Strings – The Alfred V. Brown String Section
    Trombone – Gerald Chamberlain
    Trumpet – John Gatchell

Credits
 Recorded at Secret Sound Studios, NY, Mediasound, NY, CBS Recording Studios, NY
 Mixed at Mediasound, NY
 Mastered at A&M Recording Studios

References

1980 albums
Cissy Houston albums
Columbia Records albums